Bengești-Ciocadia is a commune in Gorj County, Oltenia, Romania. It is composed of four villages: Bengești (the commune centre), Bălcești, Bircii and Ciocadia.

References

Communes in Gorj County
Localities in Oltenia